Robert Sarsfield Maloney (February 3, 1881 – November 8, 1934) was a United States representative from Massachusetts.

Early life and education
Maloney was born in Lawrence, Massachusetts. He attended public schools and learned the printer's trade.

Trade Union activities
Maloney was a fraternal delegate of the American Federation of Labor to the 1907 Canadian Trades and Labor Congress in Winnipeg, Manitoba. He was New England organizer for the International Typographical Union 1908–1912.

Lawrence Board of Aldermen
He was elected a member of the Lawrence, Massachusetts Board of Aldermen in 1909 and he served as the Board's president.

City commissioner for Public health

In the November 7, 1911 city election the voters enacted a new city charter that enacted a City Commission form of government in Lawrence. The new charter  took effect on January 1, 1912. Maloney was member of the city commission  in 1912, and from 1916 to 1920 and served as president. Maloney was elected to the city commission to serve as the director of the Department of Public Health and Charities, Maoney served in this capacity  in 1912 and 1915–1920.

Congressional service
Maloney was elected as a Republican to the  Sixty-seventh Congress from (March 4, 1921 – March 3, 1923), but was not a candidate for renomination. As of 2023, he was the last Republican to represent the 7th congressional district. He again served as director of the Department of Public Health and Charities, from 1924 until 1928, published a weekly newspaper and, later, engaged in the restaurant business until his death.

Death and Burial
Maloney died in Lawrence on November 8, 1934. His interment was in Immaculate Conception Cemetery.

References

Notes

Sources

1881 births
1934 deaths
Massachusetts city council members
Politicians from Lawrence, Massachusetts
Catholics from Massachusetts
Republican Party members of the United States House of Representatives from Massachusetts
20th-century American politicians